Charles T. Chester (3 December 1919 – 17 December 2011) was an English rugby union, and professional rugby league footballer who played in the 1930s, 1940s and 1950s.

Background
Charlie Chester's birth was  registered in Wakefield district, West Riding of Yorkshire, England, and he died aged 92 in Wakefield, West Yorkshire, England.

Personal life
Charles Chester marriage to Mary (née Strutt) (birth registered first ¼ 1923 in Wakefield district) was registered during third ¼ 1945 in Wakefield district. They had children; the future rugby union and rugby league footballer; David "Dave" C. Chester (birth registered third ¼  in Wakefield district), Ana Yvonne Chester (birth registered during third ¼  in Wakefield district), and Philip T. Chester (birth registered during second ¼  in Wakefield district). Before their marriage Charles and Mary served in World War II, returning home to marry and have children. Charles Chester's funeral service took place at St Paul’s Church, Alverthorpe on Wednesday, 28 December 2011, and was followed by a burial at Sugar Lane cemetery, Wakefield adjacent to Belle Vue stadium.

References

External links
Search for "Chester" at rugbyleagueproject.org

1919 births
2011 deaths
British military personnel of World War II
English rugby league players
English rugby union players
Footballers who switched code
Rugby league players from Wakefield
Rugby league second-rows
Rugby league props
Rugby union players from Wakefield
Wakefield Trinity players